The North American Soccer League operated from 2011 to 2017 and presented several awards for individual performance at the end of each season.

Best XI

The Best XI is awarded to the eleven players considered to have been the best in their respective positions.

Golden Ball Award
The Golden Ball is the league MVP award.

Golden Boot Award
The Golden Boot is the league's leading scorer.

Golden Glove Award
The Golden Glove is the league's goalkeeper of the year award.

Coach of the Year Award
The Coach of the Year award was initiated in 2011 with an independent panel.  In 2012 the NASL adopted it as an official award.

Fair Play Award
Awarded to the team with the lowest point total from Yellow and Red cards throughout the season.

Goal of the Year Award
Award voted on by the fans over the internet for the best goal of the season.

Young Player of the Year
Award given to the league's top player under the age of 24.

Humanitarian of the Year
Award given to the player who most positively impact the lives of others.

Player of the Month

Awarded monthly to the best NASL player.

References

Other Awards
American soccer trophies and awards